Richie Birkenhead (born Richard James Birkenhead; August 23, 1965) is an American rock musician and creative director. He was a singer, songwriter and guitarist of late '80s New York hardcore bands Underdog and Youth of Today, and went on in the 1990s to become vocalist for the American rock band, Into Another.

Early life 
In his early teens, while living on the Upper West Side of Manhattan and attending the McBurney School, Birkenhead started a neo-rockabilly band, the Bel-Airs, with members of Buzz and the Flyers and Tav Falco's Panther Burns. Birkenhead was the Bel-Airs' guitarist, songwriter and occasional vocalist. Although they never officially released any recorded material, the band played regularly in many New York venus, including Mudd Club, Peppermint Lounge, Danceteria, The Ritz and CBGB and opened for The Cramps, The Gun Club, The Rockats and Carl Perkins.

Music career 
During the mid-to-late '80s, Birkenhead fronted the hardcore bands Numskuls (1983–1985) and Underdog (1985–1989). In 1986 he joined the straight edge hardcore band Youth of Today on guitar. He spent time touring with the band, as well as recording the band's first full-length offering, 1986's Break Down the Walls.

Birkenhead, along with Youth of Today drummer, Drew Thomas, left the band in 1990 to form the band, Into Another, with guitarist Peter Moses and bassist Tony Bono. Into Another released its first self-titled full-length album in 1990 on Revelation Records, followed by two EPs and another full-length before signing with Hollywood Records in 1995. During the band's stint on Hollywood Records, Into Another released "Seemless" in 1996, in which Birkenhead and the band entered the Billboard 200 for the first time with the song "T.A.I.L.", peaking at number 39 on the mainstream rock chart.

Conflict between Birkenhead and Hollywood Records, as well as internal tensions led to the dissolution of Into Another after 1997, leaving an unreleased full-length album entitled "Soul Control".

During the next 15 years, Birkenhead appeared only occasionally at solo acoustic shows.

In June 2012, as part of the Revelation Records 25th Anniversary shows, Into Another was reformed, and, with Richie Birkenhead, Drew Thomas, Peter Moses, Brian Balchack and Reid Black, Into Another made its first appearance in over 15 years. The band has continued to perform, and Richie Birkenhead is again fully active with Into Another and creating new music.

Discography

with into Another

with Youth of Today

with Underdog

Collaboration with other artists 

Shift – Spacesuit (1995) (as Producer)
Deadsy – Commencement (1999) (vocals on "Brand New Love")

Personal life
Richie Birkenhead is the son of lyricist Susan Birkenhead. He married Samantha Kluge, style editor of Glamour magazine and daughter of late media mogul John Kluge, in 2000. The marriage ended in divorce in 2002. In 2006, Birkenhead married art dealer Jamie Harman. The couple have two children.

Birkenhead is vegan.

References

External links 

 
 
 Richie Birkenhead at BandToBand.com

Living people
American heavy metal singers
American multi-instrumentalists
American male singer-songwriters
1965 births
American alternative rock musicians
American rock guitarists
American male guitarists
Dark ambient musicians
Singer-songwriters from New York (state)
Alternative metal musicians
Guitarists from New York City
McBurney School alumni
20th-century American guitarists
20th-century American male musicians